Serenity Knolls is an album by guitarists Bill Brovold and Jamie Saft released on the RareNoise label in 2017.

Reception

On All About Jazz, Dan Bilawsky called it"an album of front porch twang-and-strum, evoking peacefulness on the prairies and offering one American idyll after another" noting "Bill Brovold and Jamie Saft have managed to capture the heart, spirit, and sound of a country day in their duo explorations. Heartland, hearth, and home sweet home are well-represented on Serenity Knolls". Chronogram's James Keepnews wrote "Although Kingston-based Rasta polymath Jamie Saft is best known as an accomplished keyboardist and studio maven, his recorded work as a guitarist dates as far back as two decades ... His dobro and lap steel skills get a rare, ample, and ravishing workout on this new collaboration with his fellow local multi-instrumentalist, guitarist Bill Brovold. The album title references the rehab center where Jerry Garcia died, striking a fitting balance for these 12 often stark tone poems—some warm and serene, others as dark and searching as the emotions upon the loss of a loved one. Much of the darkness comes from Brovold's chimes-at-midnight, dirge-y chordal atmospheres enveloping Saft's adept, pealing slide chorales".

Track listing
All compositions by Bill Brovold and Jamie Saft
 "Sweet Grass" – 8:33
 "Mitchimakinak" – 7:25
 "Saddle Horn" – 4:58
 "Wendigo" – 4:23
 "Thermopolis" – 8:46
 "The Great American Bison" – 6:08
 "Bemidji" – 5:42	
 "No Horse Seen" – 5:02
 "Splintering Wind" – 5:02
 "Greybuli" – 6:54	
 "Serenity Knolls" – 6:35	
 "Silent Midpoint" – 7:00

Personnel
Bill Brovold – electric guitar
Jamie Saft - dobro, lap steel guitar

References

Jamie Saft albums
2017 albums
RareNoiseRecords albums